Marjorie Powell Allen (1929-1992) was an American philanthropist from Kansas City, Missouri who worked with the Powell Foundation.

Allen gave two day camps and a residential camp for children, but most notably she donated 809 acres of Powell family land that became Powell Botanical Gardens.

Allen also helped found the Women's Employment Network of Kansas City and Central Exchange.  The Network helps women on public assistance find jobs.  The Central Exchange is a professional organization for diverse women.

In 1988, Allen was voted Philanthropist of the Year by the Greater Kansas City Council on Philanthropy.  She also received the "Friend to Youth" award from the American Humanics program at Rockhurst College in 1985.

When she died after battling a long illness, her memorial celebration was held on the grounds of Powell Botanical Gardens.

References

1929 births
1992 deaths
People from Kansas City, Missouri
Philanthropists from the Kansas City metropolitan area
20th-century American philanthropists